Sinpung Station is a station on Seoul Subway Line 7. It will also most likely become a station on the Sin Ansan Line in the future.

Station layout

Railway stations opened in 2000
Seoul Metropolitan Subway stations
Metro stations in Yeongdeungpo District